Everything I Love is a 1996 album by Alan Jackson.

Everything I Love may also refer to:

 "Everything I Love" (song), a 1997 song by Alan Jackson
 Everything I Love (Eliane Elias album), 2000
 Everything I Love (Jason Blaine album), 2013
 Everything I Love (Kenny Drew album), 1974 
 Everything I Love (Roland Hanna album), 2002